Nikolaos Christodoulou was a Greek infantry officer who rose to the rank of Major General.

Biography

Christodoulou was born on 18 July 1863 in Chalcis. He enlisted in the Hellenic Army on 14 July 1878. By 1897 he was an officer in the 2nd Infantry Regiment, and fought in the Greco-Turkish War 1897.

In the Balkan Wars of 1912–13 he initially served as battalion commander in the 3rd Infantry Regiment. On 20 June 1913 and until the Battle of Kresna he assumed command of the 1st Infantry Regiment following the death of the latter's commander, Col. F. Dialetis. He then returned to command his battalion for a few days, before assuming command of the entire 3rd Regiment, which he led during the last days of the Second Balkan War.

In 1916, following the Bulgarian invasion of eastern Macedonia, he did not obey orders from Athens to surrender and joined with his men the "National Defence" in Thessaloniki and assumed command of the Serres Division, which he led to the front near Gevgeli in December 1916. He continued to command the division until 1918, when he was replaced due to illness. He retired on 24 April 1924.

References 

1863 births
20th-century deaths
Year of death missing
20th-century Greek people
Hellenic Army major generals
Greek military personnel of the Balkan Wars
Greek military personnel of World War I
People from Chalcis